Mohammad Bagher Nobakht Haghighi (born 13 December 1950 in Rasht, Iran) is an Iranian politician and economist. He was Hassan Rouhani's advisor for Supervision and Strategic Affairs and also was the Head of Plan and Budget Organization from 2016 to 2021. He was Spokesman of the Government from 2013 to 2018. He is also the former Head of Management and Planning Organization and secretary-general of the Moderation and Development Party.

He was a representative of Rasht in the Islamic Consultative Assembly for four consecutive terms. He was the spokesman for Rouhani's 2013 presidential election and also Deputy of Economic Research Department at the Center for Strategic Research, a think tank led by Rouhani.

Following Rouhani's election, Nobakht was appointed as the president's liaison to the legislative branch led by Ali Ardashir Larijani, with the mandate to "establish communication and moderation" between the two branches of government; Larijani appointed Mohammad-Reza Bahonar as Nobakht's counterpart. He was appointed as advisor for Supervision and Strategic Affairs on 5 August 2013 by Rouhani. On 11 August 2013, he was appointed vice president for planning and strategic supervision.

References

External links

Iranian economists
People from Rasht
Vice presidents of Iran
Living people
1950 births
Spokespersons of the Government of Iran
Moderation and Development Party politicians
Deputies of Rasht
Secretaries-General of political parties in Iran
Members of the 7th Islamic Consultative Assembly
Members of the 6th Islamic Consultative Assembly
Members of the 5th Islamic Consultative Assembly
Members of the 4th Islamic Consultative Assembly
Members of the 3rd Islamic Consultative Assembly